The global hectare (gha) is a measurement unit for the ecological footprint of people or activities and the biocapacity of the Earth or its regions. One global hectare is the world's annual amount of biological production for human use and human waste assimilation, per hectare of biologically productive land and fisheries.

It measures production and consumption of different products. It starts with the total biological production and waste assimilation in the world, including crops, forests (both wood production and CO2 absorption), grazing and fishing.
The total of these kinds of production, weighted by the richness of the land they use, is divided by the number of hectares used. Biologically productive areas include cropland, forest and fishing grounds, and do not include deserts, glaciers and the open ocean. 

"Global hectares per person" refers to the amount of production and waste assimilation per person on the planet. In 2012 there were approximately 12.2 billion global hectares of production and waste assimilation, averaging 1.7 global hectares per person.
Consumption totaled 20.1 billion global hectares or 2.8 global hectares per person, meaning about 65% more was consumed than produced. This is possible because there are natural reserves all around the globe that function as backup food, material and energy supplies, although only for a relatively short period of time. Due to rapid population growth, these reserves are being depleted at an ever increasing tempo. See Earth Overshoot Day.

The term "global hectar" was introduced in the early 2000s, based on a similar concept from the 1970s named "ghost acerage".
Opponents and defenders of the concept have discussed its strengths and weaknesses.

Applications
The global hectare is a useful measure of biocapacity as it can convert things like human dietary requirements into common units, which can show how many people a certain region on earth can sustain, assuming current technologies and agricultural methods. It can be used as a way of determining the relative carrying capacity of the earth.

Different hectares of land can provide different amounts of global hectares. For example, a hectare of lush area with high rainfall would scale higher in global hectares than would a hectare of desert.

It can also be used to show that consuming different foods may increase the earth's ability to support larger populations. To illustrate, producing meat generally requires more land and energy than what producing vegetables requires; sustaining a meat-based diet would require a less populated planet.

Hectare equivalents
On average, a global hectare can be produced in the area of a standard hectare.

See also

References

Ecology